KFLS (1450 AM) is a radio station broadcasting a News Talk Information format. Licensed to Klamath Falls, Oregon, United States, the station is currently owned and operated by Wynne Enterprises, LLC, and features programming from CNN Radio.  The program and sports director is Randy Adams and news director Paul Hanson.

News talk programming
KFLS currently features news talk programs from such personalities as Laura Ingraham, Lars Larson, Michael Savage, Rusty Humphries, Phil Hendrie.

Sports programming
They were a partial affiliate of ESPN Radio until rival station KLAD acquired full-time affiliation in February 2014.  Starting that same year, the station became the high school sports station of the Henley High School Hornets, with Bill Crawford currently on play-by-play.  (Sister station KRJW-AM covers the Mazama High School Vikings.)

References

External links

FLS (AM)
News and talk radio stations in the United States
Klamath Falls, Oregon